Griffith Ridge is a rock ridge  long in the Bowers Mountains of Victoria Land, Antarctica, located just within the mouth of Champness Glacier, where the latter joins the larger Lillie Glacier. This geographical feature was first mapped by the United States Geological Survey from surveys and U.S. Navy air photos, 1960–62, and was named by the Advisory Committee on Antarctic Names for Lieutenant Harry G. Griffith, U.S. Navy, public works officer at McMurdo Station, Hut Point Peninsula, Ross Island, 1967. This ridge lies situated on the Pennell Coast, a portion of Antarctica lying between Cape Williams and Cape Adare.

References

Ridges of Victoria Land
Pennell Coast